A Foozle at the Tee Party is a 1915 American short comedy film featuring Harold Lloyd.

Cast
 Harold Lloyd as Lonesome Luke
 Snub Pollard (as Harry Pollard)
 Earl Mohan
 Gene Marsh
 Bebe Daniels
 Arthur Harrison
 Clifford Silsby

See also
 List of American films of 1915
 Harold Lloyd filmography

References

External links

1915 films
Silent American comedy films
1915 short films
American silent short films
1915 comedy films
American black-and-white films
Films directed by Hal Roach
Lonesome Luke films
American comedy short films
1910s American films